William David Fraser Dow (born 27 November 1933 in Glasgow) is a former Scottish cricketer. A right arm paceman, he took 34 wickets for Scotland.

He played a County Championship game for Essex against Kent during the 1959 season but went wicketless. For his club side Clydesdale he managed 1393 runs and 245 wickets.

References

External links
Cricket Europe

1933 births
Living people
Scottish cricketers
Essex cricketers
Cumberland cricketers
Cricketers from Glasgow